Elizabeth Pérez Justiniano (born 5 November 1985) is a Bolivian former footballer who played as a forward. She has been a member of the Bolivia women's national team.

International career
Pérez capped for Bolivia at senior level during the 2003 South American Women's Football Championship.

References

1985 births
Living people
Bolivian women's footballers
Women's association football forwards
Bolivia women's international footballers